The 12th Cannes Film Festival was held from 30 April to 15 May 1959. The Palme d'Or went to the Orfeu Negro by Marcel Camus. The festival opened with Les Quatre Cents Coups, directed by François Truffaut and closed with The Diary of Anne Frank, directed by George Stevens.

In 1959, the Marché du Film (lit. Film Market) was established as the business counterpart of the Cannes Film Festival, with the aim of helping meet the needs of film industry professionals. Before this year the market was held unofficially in the cinemas of the rue d'Antibes in Cannes. Another important development of that year for the Festival, was that the French cinema moved away from  the Ministry of Industry and became part of Ministry of Cultural Affairs.

Jury
The following people were appointed as the Jury of the 1959 competition:

Feature films
Marcel Achard (France) Jury President
Antoni Bohdziewicz (Poland)
Michael Cacoyannis (Greece)
Carlos Cuenca (Spain)
Pierre Daninos (France)
Julien Duvivier (France)
Max Favalelli (France)
Gene Kelly (USA)
Carlo Ponti (Italy)
Micheline Presle (France)
Sergei Vasilyev (Soviet Union)
Short films
Philippe Agostini (France)
Antonin Brousil (Czechoslovakia)
Paula Talaskivi (Finland)
Jean Vivie (France) (CST official)
Véra Volmane (France) (journalist)

Feature film competition
The following feature films competed for the Palme d'Or:

The 400 Blows (Les Quatre Cents Coups) by François Truffaut
Araya by Margot Benacerraf
Arms and the Man (Helden) by Franz Peter Wirth
Black Orpheus (Orfeu Negro) by Marcel Camus
Bloody Twilight (Matomeno iliovasilemma) by Andreas Labrinos
The Chasers (Jakten) by Erik Løchen
Compulsion by Richard Fleischer
Court Martial (Kriegsgericht) by Kurt Meisel
Desire (Touha) by Vojtěch Jasný
The Diary of Anne Frank by George Stevens
Édes Anna by Zoltán Fábri
Eva (Die Halbzarte) by Rolf Thiele
Fanfare by Bert Haanstra
Hiroshima Mon Amour by Alain Resnais
A Home for Tanya by Lev Kulidzhanov
Honeymoon (Luna de Miel) by Michael Powell
Lajwanti by Narendra Suri
Middle of the Night by Delbert Mann
A Midsummer Night's Dream (Sen noci svatojanske) by Jiří Trnka
Miss April (Fröken April) by Göran Gentele
Nazarín by Luis Buñuel
Policarpo (Policarpo, ufficiale di scrittura) by Mario Soldati
Portuguese Rhapsody (Rapsódia Portuguesa) by João Mendes
Room at the Top by Jack Clayton
The Snowy Heron (Shirasagi) by Teinosuke Kinugasa
The Soldiers of Pancho Villa (La Cucaracha) by Ismael Rodríguez
Stars (Sterne) by Konrad Wolf
Sugar Harvest (Zafra) by Lucas Demare
Tang fu yu sheng nu by Tien Shen
Train Without a Timetable (Vlak bez voznog reda) by Veljko Bulajić

Short film competition
The following short films competed for the Short Film Palme d'Or:

 A Telhetetlen mehecske by Gyula Macskássy
 Cinématographier or Préhistoire du cinema by Emile Degelin
 Corrida interdite by Denys Colomb Daunant
 Deca sa granice by Purisa Djordjevic
 Eine Stadt feiert Geburtstag by Ferdinand Khittl
 Espana 1.800 by Jesús Fernández Santos
 Fartsfeber by Finn Carlsby
 Histoire d'un poisson rouge by Edmond Sechan
 Hsi yu chi by Tei Yang
 La mer et les jours by Alain Kaminker, Raymond Vogel
 La primera fundacion de Buenos Aires by Fernando Birri
 Le petit pecheur de la Mer de Chine by Serge Hanin
 Le Seigneur Julius by Khaled Abdul Wahab
 Ligeud ad luftvejen by Henning Carlsen
 Butterflies Don't Live Here (Motyli zde neziji) by Miro Bernat
 Neobjknovennie vstretchi by Archa Ovanessova
 New York, New York by Francis Thompson
 Paese d'America by Gian Luigi Polidoro
 Pecheurs de Sozopol by Nikolay Borovishki
 See Pakistan by W.J. Moylan
 Sinn im Sinnlosen by Bernhard Von Peithner-Lichtenfels
 Taj Mahal (short film) by Shri Mushir Ahmed
 Ten Men in a Boat by Sydney Latter
 The Fox Has Four Eyes by Jamie Uys
 The Living Stone by John Feeney
 Tussenspel bij kaarslicht by Charles Huguenot Van Der Linden
 Zmiana warty (The Changing of the Guard) by Włodzimierz Haupe

Awards

Official awards
The following films and people received the 1959 awards:
Palme d'Or: Orfeu Negro by Marcel Camus
Prix spécial du jury: Stars by Konrad Wolf
Best Director: François Truffaut for The 400 Blows (Les Quatre Cents Coups)
Best Actress: Simone Signoret for Room at the Top
Best Actor: Dean Stockwell, Bradford Dillman and Orson Welles for Compulsion
Best Comedy Award: Policarpo, ufficiale di scrittura by Mario Soldati
International Award: Nazarín by Luis Buñuel
Special Mention: The Snowy Heron (Shirasagi) by Teinosuke Kinugasa
Award of the best selection to Czechoslovakia:
Desire (Touha) by Vojtěch Jasný
A Midsummer Night's Dream (Sen noci svatojanske) by Jiří Trnka
Short films
Short Film Palme d'Or: Butterflies Don't Live Here (Motyli zde neziji) by Miro Bernat
Short film Jury Prize:
 New York, New York by Francis Thompson
 Zmiana warty (The Changing of the Guard) by Włodzimierz Haupe
Prix spécial du Jury:  Histoire d'un poisson rouge by Edmond Sechan
Short film - Special mention: Le petit pecheur de la Mer de Chine by Serge Hanin
Short film - Hommage: La mer et les jours by Alain Kaminker, Raymond Vogel

Independent awards
FIPRESCI
 FIPRESCI Prize:
Hiroshima Mon Amour by Alain Resnais
Araya by Margot Benacerraf
Commission Supérieure Technique
 Technical Grand Prize: Honeymoon (Luna de Miel) by Michael Powell
OCIC Award
 The 400 Blows (Les Quatre Cents Coups) by François Truffaut

References

Media
Institut National de l'Audiovisuel: Opening of the 1959 festival
INA: Arrival of the celebrities in Cannes (commentary in French)
INA: List of winners of the 1959 Festival (commentary in French)

External links 
1959 Cannes Film Festival (web.archive)
Official website Retrospective 1959 
Cannes Film Festival Awards for 1959 at Internet Movie Database

Cannes Film Festival, 1959
Cannes Film Festival, 1959
Cannes Film Festival
Cannes Film Festival
Cannes Film Festival